is a Japanese footballer who plays and captains for Avispa Fukuoka in the J1 League.

Club career statistics
Updated to end of 2022 season.

1Includes J1 & J2 Playoffs.

References

External links
Profile at Avispa Fukuoka

1986 births
Living people
Association football people from Fukuoka Prefecture
Japanese footballers
J1 League players
J2 League players
Avispa Fukuoka players
Association football forwards